Pertti "Pepe" Kalevi Ahlqvist (born July 4, 1956) is a Finnish blues singer and musician.

Notes

External links
 

Living people
1956 births
Blues guitarists
Finnish blues musicians
Finnish guitarists
Finnish male guitarists
20th-century Finnish male singers
Finnish male singer-songwriters
Finnish harmonica players